Michael O'Connell is Professor of Botany at the National University of Ireland, Galway.

O'Connell is a member of the Palaeoenvironmental Research Unit and a member of the Environmental Protection Agency. His areas of interests include past environments, past climate change, long-term human impact and late-glacial and Holocene environments.

Select bibliography
 Connemara:Vegetation and Land Use Since the Last Ice Age, Dublin, 1994.
 "Fresh insights into long-term changes in flora, vegetation, land use and soil erosion in the karstic environment of the Burren, western Ireland", with I. Feeser, in Journal of Ecology 97, pp. 1083–1100, 2009.
 "Palaeoecological investigations in the Barrees Valley", in Local worlds: Early settlement landscapes and upland farming in south-west Ireland, pp. 285–322, Cork, 2009.

References 

People from County Galway
Living people
Academics of the University of Galway
20th-century Irish botanists
Year of birth missing (living people)
21st-century Irish botanists